Toshinori is a masculine Japanese given name.

Possible writings
Toshinori can be written using different combinations of kanji characters. Some examples: 

敏徳, "agile, virtue"
敏憲, "agile, constituition"
敏典, "agile, law code"
敏紀, "agile, chronicle"
敏則, "agile, measure"
敏範, "agile, pattern"
俊徳, "talented, virtue"
俊紀, "talented, chronicle"
年紀, "year, chronicle"
年徳, "year, virtue"
利紀, "benefit, chronicle"
利徳, "benefit, virtue"
寿紀, "long life, chronicle"
寿徳, "long life, virtue"
等則, "grade, measure"

The name can also be written in hiragana としのり or katakana トシノリ.

Notable people with the name

, Japanese baseball player
Toshinori Kira (吉良 俊則, born 1986), Japanese baseball player.
, Japanese boxer
, Japanese trumpeter
Toshinori Muto (武藤 俊憲, born 1978), Japanese golfer
, Japanese manga artist
, Russian sumo wrestler
, Japanese singer-songwriter

Fictional characters

 Toshinori Yagi (八木 俊典), AKA: All Might, from the manga and anime My Hero Academia
 Toshinori Honda (本田 敏則), from manga and anime Hikaru no Go

Japanese masculine given names